Thomas Baptist Morello (born May 30, 1964) is an American guitarist, singer, songwriter, and political activist. He is best known for his tenure with the rap metal band Rage Against the Machine and  then with the rock band Audioslave. Between 2016 and 2019, Morello was a member of the supergroup Prophets of Rage. Morello was also a touring musician with Bruce Springsteen and the E Street Band. He is also known for his acoustic solo act, the Nightwatchman, and Street Sweeper Social Club. Morello co-founded Axis of Justice, which airs a monthly program on Pacifica Radio station KPFK (90.7 FM) in Los Angeles.

Born in Harlem, New York and raised in Libertyville, Illinois, Morello became interested in music and politics while in high school. He attended Harvard University and earned a Bachelor of Arts degree from the Committee on Degrees in Social Studies. After his previous band Lock Up disbanded, Morello met Zack de la Rocha. The two founded Rage Against the Machine together, going on to become one of the more popular and influential rock acts of the 1990s.

He is best known for his unique and creative guitar playing style, which incorporates feedback noise, unconventional picking, and tapping, as well as heavy use of guitar effects. Morello is also known for his socialist political views and activism; creating the Nightwatchman offered an outlet for his views while playing apolitical music with Audioslave. He was ranked number 40 in Rolling Stone magazine's list of the "100 Greatest Guitarists".

Early life
Thomas Baptist Morello was born on May 30, 1964 in Harlem, New York to parents Ngethe Njoroge and Mary Morello. Morello, an only child, is the son of an American mother of Italian and Irish descent and a Kenyan Kikuyu father. His mother was a schoolteacher from Marseilles, Illinois, who earned a Master of Arts at Loyola University, Chicago and traveled to Germany, Spain, Japan, and Kenya as an English language teacher between 1977 and 1983.

His father participated in the Mau Mau Uprising (1952–1960) and was Kenya's first ambassador to the United Nations. Morello's paternal great-uncle, Jomo Kenyatta, was the first elected president of Kenya. His aunt, Jemimah Gecaga, was the first woman to serve in the legislature of Kenya; and his uncle Njoroge Mungai was a Kenyan Cabinet Minister, Member of Parliament, and was considered one of the founding fathers of modern Kenya. His parents met in August 1963 while attending a pro-democracy protest in Nairobi, Kenya. After discovering her pregnancy, Mary Morello returned to the United States with Njoroge in November and married in New York City.

When Morello was 16 months old, Njoroge returned to his native Kenya and denied his paternity of his son. Morello was raised by his mother in Libertyville, Illinois and attended Libertyville High School, where his mother was a U.S. history teacher. She was the homeroom teacher for Morello's classmate and fellow guitarist Adam Jones, later of the band Tool. Morello sang in the school choir and was active in the speech and drama clubs; a prominent role he played was that of Oberon in A Midsummer Night's Dream.

Morello developed left-leaning political proclivities early, and has described himself as having been "the only anarchist in a conservative high school", and has since identified as a nonsectarian socialist. In the 1980 mock elections at Libertyville, he campaigned for a fictitious anarchist "candidate" named Hubie Maxwell, who came in fourth place in the election. He also wrote a piece headlined "South Africa: Racist Fascism That We Support" for the school alternative newspaper, The Student Pulse.

Morello graduated from high school with honors in June 1982 and enrolled at Harvard University as a political science student that autumn. Morello's band 'Bored of Education' won the Ivy League Battle of the Bands in 1986 with Carolyn Bertozzi on keyboards (a laureate of the 2022 Nobel Prize in Chemistry). Morello graduated in 1986 with a Bachelor of Arts degree in social studies. He moved to Los Angeles, where he supported himself, first by working as a stripper.When I graduated from Harvard and moved to Hollywood, I was unemployable. I was literally starving, so I had to work menial labor and, at one point, I even worked as an exotic dancer. 'Brick House' (by the Commodores) was my jam! I did bachelorette parties and I'd go down to my boxer shorts. Would I go further? All I can say is thank God it was in the time before YouTube! You could make decent money doing that job – people do what they have to do. Adam Jones, his high school classmate, moved to Los Angeles as well; Morello introduced Jones and Maynard James Keenan to Danny Carey, who would come to form the band Tool.

From 1987 to 1988, Morello worked in the office of United States Senator Alan Cranston (D-CA); however, this proved to be a negative experience for Morello, who decided never to pursue a career in politics.I never had any real desire to work in politics but if there was any ember burning in me, it was extinguished working in that job because of two things: one of them was the fact that 80 per cent of the time I spent with the Senator, he was on the phone asking rich people for money. It just made me understand that the whole business was dirty. He had to compromise his entire being every day. The other was the time a woman phoned up to the office and wanted to complain that there were Mexicans moving into her neighborhood. I said to her, 'Ma'am, you're a damn racist', and she was indignant. I thought I was representing our cause well, but I got yelled at for a week by everyone for saying that! I thought to myself that if I'm in a job where I can't call a damn racist a damn racist, then it's not for me.

Musical influences 
At age 13, Morello joined his first band, a cover band called Nebula, as the lead singer; Nebula covered material by bands including Led Zeppelin, Steve Miller Band, and Bachman–Turner Overdrive. At this same age, Morello purchased his first guitar. Around 1982, Morello first started studying the guitar seriously. He had formed a band in the same year called the Electric Sheep, featuring future Tool guitarist Adam Jones on bass. He wrote original material for the band that included politically charged lyrics. He has said that he was profoundly influenced by Run-D.M.C, and Jam Master Jay in particular. This influence can be heard in songs like "Bulls on Parade" where his guitar solos mimic a DJ scratching. Additionally, the Bomb Squad and Public Enemy has had a large impact on his musical style.

At the time, Morello's musical tastes lay in the direction of hard rock and heavy metal, particularly Kiss and Iron Maiden. As he stated in Flight 666, he is a huge fan of Piece of Mind, Alice Cooper, Led Zeppelin, and Black Sabbath. In an interview with MTV he said Black Sabbath "set the standard for all heavy bands to come". He cited Sabbath guitarist Tony Iommi as one of his biggest influences as a riff writer. Morello developed his own unique sound through the electric guitar. Later, his musical style and politics were greatly influenced by punk rock bands like the Clash, the Sex Pistols, and Devo, and artists such as Bruce Springsteen and Bob Dylan. On Queen he said, "It's one of the few bands in the history of rock music that was actually best in a stadium. And I miss Freddie Mercury very much."

Recording career

Lock Up (1987–1990)

In the mid 1980s, Morello joined the band Lock Up, for which he played guitar. The band's debut album, Something Bitchin' This Way Comes, was issued by major label Geffen Records in 1989. Lock Up had disbanded prior to Morello forming Rage Against the Machine.

Rage Against the Machine (1991–2000; 2007–2011, 2019–present)

In 1991, Morello was looking to form a new band after Lock Up disbanded. Morello was impressed by Zack de la Rocha's freestyle rapping and asked him to join his band. He also drafted drummer Brad Wilk, whom he knew from Lock Up, where Wilk unsuccessfully auditioned for a drumming spot. The band's lineup was completed when Zack convinced his childhood friend Tim Commerford to play bass. After frequenting the L.A. club circuit, Rage Against the Machine signed a record deal with Epic Records in 1992. That same year, the band released their self titled debut. They achieved a considerable amount of mainstream success and released three more studio albums: Evil Empire in 1996, The Battle of Los Angeles in 1999, and Renegades in 2000.

In August 2000 in Los Angeles during the Democratic National Convention, Rage Against the Machine performed outside the Staples Center to a crowd numbering in the thousands while the Convention took place inside. After several audience members began to throw rocks, the Los Angeles Police Department turned off the power and ordered the audience to disperse, firing rubber bullets and pepper spray into the crowd.

In late 2000, amid disagreements on the band's direction and Commerford's stunt at the VMA's, the disgruntled de la Rocha quit the band. On September 13, 2000, Rage Against the Machine performed their last concert at the Grand Olympic Auditorium in Los Angeles. Although Rage Against the Machine officially disbanded in October 2000, their fourth studio album, Renegades, became a collection of cover songs from artists such as Bob Dylan, MC5, Bruce Springsteen and Cypress Hill. 2003 saw the release of their last album, titled Live at the Grand Olympic Auditorium, an edited recording of the band's final two concerts on September 12 and 13, 2000 at the Grand Olympic Auditorium in Los Angeles. It was accompanied by an expanded DVD release of the last show and included a previously unreleased music video for "Bombtrack".

After disbanding, Morello, Wilk, and Commerford went on to form Audioslave with then-former Soundgarden singer Chris Cornell and released three albums and a DVD from the band's concert in Cuba. De la Rocha started working on a solo album collaboration with DJ Shadow, Company Flow, and the Roots' Questlove, but the project was dropped in favor of working with Nine Inch Nails' Trent Reznor. Recording was completed, but the album will probably never be released. So far, only two tracks have been released: "We Want It All" was featured on "Songs and Artists that Inspired Fahrenheit 9/11", and "Digging For Windows" was released as a single.

Reunions

On April 29, 2007, Rage Against the Machine reunited at the Coachella Music Festival. The band played in front of an EZLN backdrop to the largest crowds of the festival. The performance was initially thought to be a one-off, but this turned out not to be the case. The band played seven more shows in the United States in 2007 (including their first non-festival concert in seven years at the Alpine Valley Music Theater in East Troy, Wisconsin), and in January 2008, they played their first shows outside the US since re-forming as part of the Big Day Out Festival in Australia and New Zealand. In August 2008 they headlined nights at the Reading and Leeds festivals.

The band has since continued to tour around the world, headlining many large festivals in Europe and the United States, including Lollapalooza in Chicago. In 2008 the band also played shows in Denver, Colorado and Minneapolis, Minnesota to coincide with the Democratic National Convention and Republican National Convention, respectively. In July 2011, Rage Against the Machine played at L.A. Rising, a concert formed by the band in Los Angeles, in which they headlined and played with other artists including Muse and Rise Against.

On November 1, 2019, it was reported that Rage Against the Machine were reuniting for their first shows in nine years in the spring of 2020, including two appearances at that year's Coachella Valley Music and Arts Festival. The summer 2020 planned tour was postponed due to the COVID-19 pandemic.

Audioslave (2001–2007, 2017)

After de la Rocha left Rage Against the Machine, the remaining bandmates began collaborating with former Soundgarden vocalist Chris Cornell at the suggestion of producer Rick Rubin. The new group was first rumored to be called the Civilian Project, but the name Audioslave was confirmed before their first album was released.

The band released their eponymous debut album on November 19, 2002. It was a critical and commercial success, attaining triple-platinum status.

The band released their second album, Out of Exile, on May 24, 2005. It debuted at number 1 on the Billboard charts and attained platinum status. In the same year, they released a DVD documenting their trip as the first American rock band to play a free show in Cuba. The band's third album, Revelations, was released in the fall of 2006. As of February 15, 2007, Audioslave had broken up as a result of frontman Cornell's departure due to "irresolvable personality conflicts". The band reunited with Zack de la Rocha and resumed their previous band, Rage Against the Machine.

Audioslave reunited for only one show in January 2017, and there were talks about a reunion tour. However, Cornell's death on May 18, 2017, eliminated such possibility.

The Nightwatchman (2003–present)

Morello writes and performs folk music under the alias the Nightwatchman. He has explained:

In November 2003 the Nightwatchman joined artists Billy Bragg, Lester Chambers of the Chambers Brothers, Steve Earle, Jill Sobule, Boots Riley of the Coup and Mike Mills of R.E.M. on the Tell Us the Truth Tour. The thirteen-city tour was supported by unions, environmental and media reform groups including Common Cause, Free Press and A.F.L.-C.I.O. with the ultimate goal of "informing music fans, and exposing and challenging the failures of the major media outlets in the United States." Morello explained:  "Media consolidation needs smashing and globalization needs unmasking. When presidents and politicians lie, it is the job of the press to expose those lies. When the press fails, the gangstas come out from hiding. The lie becomes the law. The point of the Tell Us the Truth Tour is to help others make connections, and to show them that activism can change the policies of this country."

One of his many songs, "No One Left", which compares the aftermath of September 11 to that of a U.S. attack on Iraq, appears on the album Songs and Artists that Inspired Fahrenheit 9/11. The Nightwatchman also appeared on the album/DVD Axis Of Justice: Concert Series Volume 1, contributing the songs "Until the End", "The Road I Must Travel", and "Union Song". Morello, as the Nightwatchman, released his debut solo album, One Man Revolution, on April 24, 2007. The Nightwatchman joined the Dave Matthews Band for its short European tour in May 2007. As well as opening for the Dave Matthews Band, he was invited to guest on a couple of songs each night. The last night of this Morello/DMB arrangement was May 30, 2007 at Wembley Arena in London, on Morello's birthday. The Nightwatchman supported Ben Harper on tour. During this tour, Morello joined Harper onstage for a cover of Bob Dylan's "Masters of War", on which he plays the electric guitar in the style for which he's best known.

Morello has presided over a Hotel Café residency in L.A. since November 2007, which has featured many of his musical cohorts, including Serj Tankian, Perry Farrell, Jon Foreman of Switchfoot, Shooter Jennings, Nuno Bettencourt, Sen Dog of Cypress Hill, Jill Sobule, Boots Riley, Alexi Murdoch, Wayne Kramer of MC5 and others. On October 10, 2008, the Nightwatchman appeared on The Late Late Show with Craig Ferguson as a musical guest, promoting his new album The Fabled City. On December 17, 2011, Morello performed a live set for "Guitar Center Sessions" on DirecTV. The episode included an interview with program host, Nic Harcourt. Morello, as the Night Watchman, contributed a version of "Blind Willie McTell" on the Chimes Of Freedom: The Songs Of Bob Dylan Honoring 50 Years Of Amnesty International tribute album released in 2012.

On February 2, 2019, Morello made a guest appearance at the Foo Fighters pre-Super Bowl 53 concert in Atlanta, along with Zac Brown, for a cover of Black Sabbath's "War Pigs".

Street Sweeper Social Club (2006–present) 

Following Audioslave's breakup in 2007, Morello met up with Boots Riley of the Coup, suggesting that they start a band which Morello had named Street Sweeper. After giving Riley a tape of various songs to write to, the two created the duo Street Sweeper Social Club.

Street Sweeper Social Club opened for Nine Inch Nails and Jane's Addiction in May 2009.

Bruce Springsteen and the E Street Band (2008–2015) 

In April 2008, Morello made two guest appearances with Bruce Springsteen and the E Street Band at the Honda Center in Anaheim. They performed an extended electric version, featuring guitar solos, of "The Ghost of Tom Joad" (which had previously been covered by Rage Against the Machine on Renegades). One of these performances was included on Springsteen's Magic Tour Highlights EP as an audio track or video download. On October 29, 2009, Morello performed at the 25th Anniversary Rock & Roll Hall of Fame Concert at Madison Square Garden. He performed "The Ghost of Tom Joad", "London Calling", "Badlands", and "(Your Love Keeps Lifting Me) Higher and Higher" with Springsteen and the E Street Band.

Morello appears on two songs on Springsteen's 2012 album Wrecking Ball. He joined Springsteen, the E Street Band, and the Roots on Late Night with Jimmy Fallon to preview the album prior to its release. On December 4, 2012, Morello again joined Springsteen and the E Street Band for five songs during a concert in Anaheim. On January 17, 2013, it was announced that Morello would temporarily join Springsteen and the E Street Band on the March 2013 Australian leg of their Wrecking Ball Tour, filling in for longtime E Street Band guitarist Steve Van Zandt, who had scheduling conflicts filming the TV series Lilyhammer in Norway. During the tour, Morello joined the band in the studio to record new music.

The material Morello recorded with Springsteen appeared on Springsteen's 18th studio album, High Hopes, which was released in January 2014. Morello appears on eight of the album's 11 tracks and shares lead vocals with Springsteen on a re-recording of "The Ghost of Tom Joad". It was Morello who originally suggested that Springsteen perform the title track during a concert for the first time in March 2013. Springsteen had previously recorded the song in 1995, and the 2013 performance led to its re-recording, which subsequently developed into the album of the same name. Springsteen heavily credits Morello as being a major inspiration for the album by saying he was "my muse" and "he pushed the rest of this project to another level". Morello subsequently appeared alongside Springsteen and the E Street Band during a January 2014 appearance on Late Night with Jimmy Fallon and then on the ensuing High Hopes Tour which came to an end in May 2014. Springsteen's subsequent The River Tour 2016 featured a smaller lineup without Morello.

Morello made a surprise appearance during Springsteen and the E Street Band's The River Tour 2016 show on August 25, 2016, at MetLife Stadium in New Jersey, where he joined them on "Death to My Hometown", "American Skin (41 Shots)", "The Ghost of Tom Joad" and "Badlands".

Prophets of Rage (2016–2019) 
Prophets of Rage formed in 2016. The supergroup consists of Morello, Rage Against the Machine's bassist and backing vocalist Tim Commerford, and drummer Brad Wilk, with Public Enemy's Chuck D and DJ Lord and Cypress Hill's B-Real. Morello declared to Rolling Stone: "We're an elite task force of revolutionary musicians determined to confront this mountain of election year bullshit, and confront it head-on with Marshall stacks blazing."

The band's name derives from the title of the Public Enemy song "Prophets of Rage" from their 1988 album It Takes a Nation of Millions to Hold Us Back. To coincide with their protest performance at the Republican National Convention, the band released their debut single, entitled "Prophets of Rage". The group released the EP, "The Party's Over" in 2016, and the LP "Prophets of Rage" in 2017. The band began their "Make America Rage Again" tour of North America during the summer of 2016 and continued to tour through 2018. With the announcement of 2020 reunion of Rage Against the Machine, Prophets of Rage disbanded.

The Atlas Underground (2018) 

On July 26, Morello announced a new solo album titled The Atlas Underground featuring collaborations with Marcus Mumford, Portugal. The Man, Bassnectar, the Wu-Tang Clan's RZA and GZA, Vic Mensa, K.Flay, Big Boi, Gary Clark Jr., Pretty Lights, Killer Mike, Tim McIlrath, Steve Aoki and Whethan. The first songs released from the album are "We Don't Need You" featuring Vic Mensa and "Battle Sirens" featuring Knife Party. The Atlas Underground was released on October 12, 2018.

The Atlas Underground Fire (2021) 
On Sept 21, 2021 Tom released a new song called ‘Let’s Get The Party Started’ featuring members of Bring Me The Horizon. He followed this with the October 15, 2021 release of his second solo album, The Atlas Underground Fire. Like his first album, this included a diverse array of collaborations, with Bruce Springsteen, Eddie Vedder, Bring Me The Horizon, Phantogram, Chris Stapleton, grandson, Mike Posner, Damian Marley, phem, Protohype, Dennis Lyxzén of Refused, and Sama' Abdulhadi.

Other side projects (1992–present)
In 1992, Morello collaborated with American rap group Run-DMC on the song "Big Willie", which later appeared on their 1993 album, Down with the King. Morello and RATM bandmate Brad Wilk joined with Maynard James Keenan of Tool and Billy Gould of Faith No More to record the song "Calling Dr. Love" for the 1994 Kiss tribute album Kiss My Ass. The lineup was billed as Shandi's Addiction. Morello played lead guitar and produced on three tracks of Primus' 1999 studio album Antipop. Morello played the guitar on The Faculty soundtrack, featured with Class of '99 for their cover of Pink Floyd's "Another Brick in the Wall (pt. 2)". Morello recorded guitars along with country legend Johnny Cash during his late career with American Recordings, which was released on Unearthed. Morello was the executive producer of Anti-Flag's 2003 studio album "The Terror State". Morello played a short solo on the Benny Mason band song "Exodus IV".

As the Nightwatchman, Morello has often performed alongside Boots Riley, frontman of the Coup; also, he produced and performed on a track for the Coup's 2006 release Pick a Bigger Weapon. In July 2006, it was reported that Morello and Riley were to collaborate on a project called Street Sweepers (see section above). Morello appears in Guitar Hero III: Legends of Rock as a "guitar boss" (the first of 3 in the career mode of the game) in a night club. Beating him in a one-on-one battle (playing an original composition he recorded for the game) will unlock him as a playable character and will result in the player and Morello playing the master track of "Bulls on Parade" as an encore immediately following the battle. Morello's original composition features many of his trademark guitar effects like those heard in songs such as Audioslave's "Cochise" and "Doesn't Remind Me" and Rage Against the Machine's "Bulls on Parade" and "Sleep Now in the Fire".

In April 2006, Morello produced two tracks for the group Outernational; on the band's website, it states that Morello will be producing their debut album. In 2007, Morello was a featured guitarist in the Mortal Kombat: Armageddon official soundtrack, playing guitar for the Armory stage's battle music. On February 23, 2010, Cypress Hill released the second single, "Rise Up", from their album Rise Up featuring Morello on guitar. He is also featured on the track "Shut 'Em Down" from the same album, unlike "Rise Up", which is very similar in style to Morello's rap metal band Rage Against the Machine, it contains strong Latin and punk influences. On November 2, 2010, Travis Barker and Morello released a song alongside RZA & Raekwon called "Carry It". It would later appear on Travis's debut solo album Give the Drummer Some. Like "Rise Up", it is very similar in style to Morello's previous band Rage Against the Machine.

He is collaborating with David Rovics' latest album. Morello was featured in the song "Opinion" in the eponymous debut album by Device, which was released in April 2013. Morello is featured on Linkin Park's album The Hunting Party on the song "Drawbar", released on June 17, 2014. Morello plays the guitar solo of the song "Without End" on Anti-Flag's studio album American Spring released on May 26, 2015. In March 2016, Morello appeared with Knife Party and Pendulum as a guest at Ultra Music Festival Miami. Songs played featuring Morello's guitar work included "Battle Sirens" from his upcoming album The Atlas Underground and a mashup of the two co-headliners entitled "Pendulum VS Knife Party - Tarantula VS Bonfire." Tom, along with Michael Moore and others involved in the film industry, is also a board member of the Traverse City Film Festival, an annual event that takes place at the end of July, in Traverse City, Michigan.

On February 24, 2019, Morello appeared as a presenter at the 91st Academy Awards. In February 2021, Morello was featured on The Pretty Reckless song "And So It Went" on their album Death by Rock and Roll. In April 2021, Morello released a new song and music video with Pussy Riot, Weather Strike. He has also hosted his own weekly show, One Man Revolution, on the Lithium channel at SiriusXM. He will join an additional weekly show beginning March 2, 2021, and also an original podcast starting March 3, 2021.

On January 13, 2023, Morello was featured on Måneskin's single and music video for "Gossip".

Appearances in films
Morello has appeared as himself in an array of documentary films; such as Sounds Like a Revolution, Iron Maiden: Flight 666, about heavy metal band Iron Maiden's Somewhere Back in Time World Tour and in Chevolution, an exposé about the famous Guerrillero Heroico photo of Marxist revolutionary Che Guevara. In addition, Morello was cast as a terrorist in Iron Man, an uncredited Son'a officer in Star Trek: Insurrection and later did a cameo in the Star Trek: Voyager episode Good Shepherd, and appeared in the film Made.

Morello was featured in the 2012 documentary film Let Fury Have the Hour by writer and director Antonino D'Ambrosio, where Morello talks about world citizenship, creative activism and his support for workers' rights.

Writing
In 2011, it was announced that Morello, a lifelong comic book fan, would write a new 12-issue comic book series for Dark Horse Comics, entitled Orchid. The series is a post-apocalyptic story in which the title character is "a teenage prostitute who learns that she is more than the role society has imposed upon her." The first issue was published in October 2011, and Morello released an exclusive new song to accompany each issue. Orchid is illustrated by Canadian artist Scott Hepburn. The series was collected into three trade paperback volumes released in 2012 and 2013.

The release party sponsored by Dark Horse was held at Jetpack Comics in Rochester, New Hampshire on October 12, 2011.

Morello contributed a written introduction to the 2016 edition of The Big Red Songbook, a compendium of wobbly protest music.

In 2021, Morello started publishing a regular newsletter in the New York Times.

Guitar playing technique
Morello is famed for his guitar style, which consists of heavy metal/punk hybrid riffs and hip hop-inspired sounds. A 1993 Melody Maker live review of a Rage Against The Machine gig, said "Guitarist Tom Morello wears his guitar high up to wring every sound out of it. Falling bombs, police sirens, scratching - he can do them all."

To produce his guitar sounds, Morello chooses various effects pedals. During his tenure in RATM, he used a Dunlop Cry Baby, a DigiTech WH-1 Whammy, a Boss DD-2 Digital Delay, a DOD EQ pedal (set flat and just used to boost the volume during guitar solos or particular rocking moments), and an Ibanez DFL Flanger. Around the time of The Battle of Los Angeles he added a Boss TR-2 Tremolo pedal (which can be heard on "Guerrilla Radio"). For Audioslave, Morello replaced the Ibanez Flanger with an MXR Phase 90. His amplifier of choice has always been a 50-watt Marshall JCM 800 2205 and a Peavey 4x12 cabinet. While the Marshall amplifier has two channels, he only uses the overdrive channel, and simply lowers the volume on his guitar to get cleaner sounds.

In the studio, Morello uses the same setup for the bulk of the guitar tracks. For The Battle of Los Angeles, he also used a few other amplifiers, such as a Line 6 as heard on the clean, spacey intro of "Mic Check", plus a Pignose mini-amplifier and a MusicMan "Twin" style amplifier. During the recording of Audioslave's last album, Revelations, Morello experimented with different amplifier setups. For the title track's solo he split his signal to his standard Marshall 2205 head and Peavey cabinet and a 100 watt Fender Bassman head and an Orange cabinet. With delay sent to one while the other is unaffected the sound is being "ping-ponged" between the two amplifiers. He also borrowed a Vox AC30 amplifier from producer Brendan O'Brien for some tracks.

Morello's unique technique and talent led to him being voted the fifth greatest guitarist of the past 30 years in a 2010 BBC poll.

Politics

Political views

Morello, as well as fellow members of Rage Against the Machine, hold left-leaning political views. Morello in particular identifies as a socialist, and has called socialism a "necessity" for the world, saying “I think [socialism is] a necessity, to save the planet [...] Look at how capitalism has responded to the global pandemic – it’s a disaster. Look at how capitalism has responded to the impending environmental crisis – it’s a disaster. Look at how capitalism has responded to racism and anti-immigrant sentiment in the 21st century – it’s a disaster.”

Morello frequently uses communist imagery, such as hammer and sickle stickers on his guitars, and Red star hats. Following the death of Cuban dictator Fidel Castro, he expressed support saying "While I don’t agree with all that Fidel Castro did there is ample reason why he is vilified in the US and yet remains a huge hero throughout the Third World [...] By defying Yankee imperialism for 50 years, instituting the best healthcare, child immunization and literacy systems in the Western Hemisphere (surpassing the US and Canada), exporting doctors to countries in need all over the globe [...], and being an unrepentant advocate of the poor and exploited it is no surprise that millions will mourn his passing."

In his childhood, he cites the Black Panther party, Marxist revolutionary Che Guevara and radical left militant organization Weather Underground as "Very important to [him]. These were people who unapologetically stood up to injustice with the most forceful means necessary."

His band has expressed support for guerrilla movements such as the Zapatista Army of National Liberation, Shining Path as well as social and political movements such as the Brazilian Landless Workers' Movement.

Activism
Morello, with fellow members of Rage Against the Machine, protested the  "Parental Advisory" sticker on explicit albums and singles on the part of the Parents Music Resource Center, spearheaded by Tipper Gore. The protest consisted of the band refusing to perform at Lollapalooza 1993.  They took the stage naked, mouths covered in duct tape, and bodies painted with the organization's abbreviation, PMRC. Instead of performing, the band allowed their instruments to feedback for 14 minutes.

Morello is a member of the labor union the Industrial Workers of the World.
On August 27, 2008, Morello performed in Denver, Colorado at the Open the Debates rally in opposition to the Commission on Presidential Debates exclusion of third party candidates from the nationally televised debates. He performed "This Land is Your Land" as the Nightwatchman and endorsed independent presidential candidate Ralph Nader. Sean Penn, Jello Biafra, Brooke Smith and Cindy Sheehan were also part of the rally.

In October 2009, Morello, among a number of musicians, sued the U.S. government for the declassification of all documents relating to the use of music in interrogations at the Guantanamo Bay detention camp. He stated, "Guantanamo is known around the world as one of the places where human beings have been tortured - from waterboarding to stripping, hooding and forcing detainees into humiliating sexual acts - playing music for 72 hours in a row at volumes just below that to shatter the eardrums. Guantanamo may be Dick Cheney's idea of America, but it's not mine. The fact that music I helped create was used in crimes against humanity sickens me."

On February 21, 2011, Morello organized and performed an acoustic concert in support of the protests over collective bargaining rights in Madison, WI.  The concert also featured the MC5's Wayne Kramer and Boston punk band Street Dogs.  He wrote an article in Rolling Stone about his experience.

Morello has played at many Occupy movements, including Occupy Wall Street as well as Occupy Los Angeles, San Francisco, Chicago, Seattle, Vancouver, British Columbia, Nottingham and Newcastle, England protests.

When Republican nominee for vice president in the 2012 election Paul Ryan said that he liked the music of Beethoven, Rage Against the Machine and Led Zeppelin, Morello responded with an op-ed in Rolling Stone stating that, "Paul Ryan's love for Rage Against The Machine is amusing, because he is the embodiment of the machine that our music has been raging against for two decades."

In June 2013, Morello and numerous other celebrities appeared in a video showing support for Chelsea Manning.

On September 26, 2014, Morello played a benefit concert in Seattle for 15 Now, the group launched by Socialist Alternative and Kshama Sawant to raise the minimum wage to $15/hour. The concert was aimed at expanding the organization nationally. After playing the show, Morello encouraged a boycott of The 5 Point Cafe, a local diner in Seattle, which he claimed on Twitter was "anti-Kenyan" and "anti-worker", encouraging his fans to "spread the word." The restaurant's owner, David Meinert, responded to Morello, stating that "Rock stars don’t get special treatment at The 5 Point," and claiming that "Tom and his crew didn’t get let in as the place was at capacity and there was a line. No one was being let in." Morello responded to Meinert, stating that he would show "leniency" and "forgive" Meinert if he embraced a $15 minimum-wage.

Axis of Justice

Morello and Serj Tankian of System of a Down are the co-founders of Axis of Justice, a political group whose declared purpose is "to bring together musicians, fans of music, and grassroots political organizations to fight for social justice together." They "aim to build a bridge between fans of music around the world and local political organizations to effectively organize around issues of peace, human rights, and economic justice." The group has worked for such causes as immigrant rights and death-penalty abolition. Its recommended book list includes such authors as Karl Marx, Che Guevara, George Orwell, Noam Chomsky, Mumia Abu-Jamal and Grant Morrison.

Morello and Tankian, together with a handful of other artists, including Maynard James Keenan, Wayne Kramer of the MC5, the hip hop group Jurassic 5, and Michael "Flea" Balzary of the Red Hot Chili Peppers, released a live recording of covers and original songs, titled Axis of Justice: Concert Series Volume 1.

On April 6, 2006, Morello was honored with the Eleanor Roosevelt Human Rights Award for his support of worker's rights and for his AOJ work. Morello has worked on numerous labor campaigns: the Guess sweatshop boycott; the LA janitors strike; the Taco Bell boycott; the southern California grocery workers strike and lockout; the Democratic Socialists of America Starbucks unionization campaign and others.

Morello was a strong supporter of the 2006 United States immigration reform protests around the US. Morello played as the Nightwatchman at MacArthur Park in Los Angeles and has featured many articles on AOJ. On September 28, 2006, Morello was one of 400 protesters arrested protesting in support of immigrant hotel workers' rights, in what organizers called "the largest act of civil disobedience in the history of Los Angeles". Morello knew he was going to be arrested. He wore a bright yellow sign and gave the LAPD his driver's license number a few days before the march. Morello told MTV:

Shining Path
Controversially, Morello has on occasion expressed endorsement of the militant Peruvian communist organization Shining Path. For example, he carries a sticker of the organization on one of his guitars and in at least one interview he defends the group by deflecting reports on alleged atrocities.

Personal life
Morello and his wife Denise have two sons, Rhoads (born 2007) and Roman (born April 2011). Morello was raised Catholic and is a vegetarian. He lives in the Laurel Canyon neighborhood of Los Angeles.

Equipment

Guitars

Morello uses heavily modified guitars from various manufacturers, with each guitar having different slogans written on them that was inspired by Woody Guthrie's "This Machine Kills Fascists" guitar. As of recent, Fender has released a replica of his “Soul Power” Stratocaster.

 Mongrel Custom "Arm The Homeless" - Morello's most famous guitar, and his primary guitar for standard tuning since 1986. The original guitar was made for Morello by Performance Guitar USA to his exact specifications. It featured a Stratocaster body with a Performance Corsair neck, two Seymour Duncan JB pickups, and a chrome original Floyd Rose tremolo. The guitar was a custom build, however, when he got the guitar he hated everything about it and completely reassembled it. Since then just about everything has been changed countless times and the only thing that remains from the original guitar is the body. According to Morello, he settled on the final version of the guitar around the year 1990 and the guitar's build has remained unmodified ever since. The body is finished in light blue with the words "Arm The Homeless" written on it in black and red. It has a 3-way pickup selector toggle switch mounted on the lower horn, two volume knobs and one tone knob, four hippos painted on the front, one large hippo painted upside down on the back, and a hammer and sickle symbol sticker. The neck is a graphite Kramer knock-off of unknown make with a 22 fret rosewood fretboard and a "banana" or "hockey stick" headstock. The guitar also has Gotoh Crownhead tuners, an EMG 85/EMG H pickup set and an Ibanez Edge double-locking Tremolo. The guitar is tuned to standard E. This guitar is available in the video game Guitar Hero 3: Legends of Rock.
 Fender Stratocaster "Soul Power" - A Fender Aerodyne Stratocaster made initially as a Factory Special Run for Guitar Center. Morello found it on the rack and really liked the look of it. It has a black finished body with white binding and a color-matched headstock. It also has a mirror pickguard, Ibanez Edge double-locking Tremolo, a 2-way on/off toggle switch wired as a kill switch on the lower horn, a Seymour Duncan Hotrails pickup in the bridge, and two Fender Noiseless pickups in the middle and neck positions. It has the words "Soul Power" on the top of the body in silver paint and is his main guitar in Audioslave for songs that are in standard E tuning. Much of the guitar is original to the manufacturer's specs, however, Tom did make a few key modifications. The guitar originally features three Fender Noiseless single-coil pickups, but Tom replaced the bridge pickup with a Seymour Duncan Hot Rails Humbucker pickup. Tom also modified the electronics to add a killswitch which he placed under the neck pickup on the treble side horn of the Stratocaster. In 2020, Fender released replicas of the guitar signed by Morello as part of their 2020 Artist Series collection.
Fender Telecaster, "Sendero Luminoso" - A stock black 1982 American-made Standard Telecaster. This is Morello's main guitar for use in drop-D in Rage Against the Machine, Audioslave, Street Sweeper Social Club, and Prophets of Rage. He got this guitar in a trade with his roommate, in which Morello traded a Marshall amplifier head for the Telecaster. The guitar has various pictures taped on its body and most notably has the words "Sendero Luminoso" (referencing the Peruvian political movement) carved into the body and then painted in white and red. Also with a small red hammer and sickle communist party sticker.
Fender Telecaster 2. Black with white binding, mirror pickguard, Fender noiseless pickups, and toggle switch on the lower horn. Morello used this guitar when he played with "Fistful of Mercy" on Late Night with Conan O'Brien.
Ibanez Artstar Hollowbody (Custom) - Made especially for Morello by Ibanez, this guitar is based on an old Vox Ultrasonic. It contains several on-board effects (wah, echo, dist, treble/bass boost) and is painted in a red and black "split" design that runs over the whole guitar. Used live on the song "Guerrilla Radio" with Rage Against the Machine but rarely seen anywhere else until it was used in the video clip (and presumably on the studio recording) for Cypress Hill's "Rise Up".
St. George MP-3 "Creamy" - Morello bought this guitar at a Canadian pawn shop for $40 Canadian (about $30 American). It has been modified with a DiMarzio rail pickup in the bridge position. A toggle switch was also added that is dead in the middle position, resulting in a "hummingbird chirp" when toggled. Used as a Drop D tuning guitar for some songs on the RATM record Evil Empire. Used in Rage Against the Machine, Audioslave. Notably used for RATM songs "Calm Like a Bomb" and "Tire Me", the latter of which won the band their first Grammy. Morello stated in a 2012 video for Musician's Friend that he recorded "Tire Me" with the St. George and a 20-watt solid-state amp; he also said he's "not even sure it's made of wood" in the same video.
Ibanez Talman (Custom) - Has three single-coil "lipstick" pickups, an Ibanez Lo-Pro Edge tremolo, a killswitch and a custom Kenyan flag finish. Morello used this guitar on "Revolver", "How I Could Just Kill a Man", and "Pistol Grip Pump" for RATM and "Exploder" for Audioslave. The guitar has a faulty internal pickup that makes odd feedback noises, which Morello can adjust by adjusting the tone knob and using the guitar's tremolo. This technique can be heard at the beginning of RATM's "Revolver", Audioslave's "Exploder", and the live version of Street Sweeper Social Club's "Promenade". In addition to this effect, Morello also uses this guitar for Drop D tuning songs that require a killswitch. Morello also owns a second Talman in a white finish, with two mini-humbuckers.
Gibson EDS-1275 (Double Neck SG) - Cherry finish. Tuned to drop D on both necks. Used live on "The Ghost of Tom Joad" with RATM. Since 2017, with Prophets of Rage, Morello uses it again twice for "Rock Superstar" and on most live renditions of "How I Could Just Kill a Man".
Gibson "Budweiser" Les Paul - Given to him in 2006 by Brendan O'Brien for the recording of Audioslave's third album, Revelations, used throughout the whole record. Originally bearing an orange Budweiser logo that Morello hated and burned off with a lighter. He liked the new appearance and modified the guitar with DiMarzio pickups.
Gibson Les Paul Standard - Orange burst finish. Tuned to drop B for use in Audioslave and Street Sweeper Social Club. Morello also owns two other Les Pauls, one in a Tobacco burst finish used with Street Sweeper Social Club (it can be seen in the video for "100 Little Curses") and another in a Cherry Red finish (which he calls his "Taco Bell Les Paul"), tuned to drop D and used with Audioslave for Soundgarden covers.
James Trussart Steelcaster - A Telecaster style guitar with a body made in steel, finished with a red star graphic over a holey front. Has Seymour Duncan pickups (Alnico pro II in the neck and a Hot rails in bridge) and a killswitch on the lower horn. Seen occasionally on the Rage Against the Machine reunion tour and most recently on the High Hopes tour with Bruce Springsteen. Morello also owns one with a polished finish that was used on early tours.
 Ibanez custom guitar "Arm The Homeless duplicate"- Morello's backup guitar for "Arm The Homeless". It has all the same specs as Arm The Homeless (light blue finish, Edge trem, toggle switch on the bottom horn, EMG pickups) but has several small hippos instead of the four larger ones seen on the original guitar. This guitar can be seen briefly in the "Sleep Now in the Fire" music video and is often used live with Prophets of Rage on a few standard tuning songs like Know Your Enemy.
Ovation Breadwinner - Tuned to standard E, used for "Ashes in the Fall" for RATM. Also used with a Music Man amplifier and Tone Bender pedal to capture the Korean radio station audio heard at the end of "Sleep Now in the Fire". Morello owns two other Breadwinners and confines them to the studio because he thinks they look ugly, although he did use one of them in the video for Travis Barker's "Carry It", which he is featured in, and in the video for Prophets of Rage's "Living on the 110".
Music Man St Vincent - Given to him by bandmate Tim Commerford as a gift in 2018.
"Whatever It Takes" guitar - A custom Ibanez Galvador classical acoustic guitar he uses during concerts as the Nightwatchman. Plain body with 'Whatever It Takes' and a star (★) written to the left of the bridge.
"Black Spartacus" guitar - A black Gibson J-45 steel string acoustic guitar Morello uses for The Nightwatchman, used prominently on the World Wide Rebel Songs album. Has Morello's own symbol on the left of the bridge which combines the Kenyan, Italian and American flags along with the hammer and sickle symbols and "Black Spartacus" in white on the top of the guitar. Morello says he wrote the song "Black Spartacus Heart Attack Machine" as a love song for this new guitar, which appears in the music video for this song.
Tanglewood Acoustic Guitar.
Gibson Explorer II - In a gold finish with gold hardware. This was Morello's main guitar in college, although he claims he ruined its sound by installing a Kahler Tremolo System. According to Tom, this was the guitar we acquired in the early 1980s when he felt he needed to upgrade his guitar from the Kay K-20T.
Kay K-20T - Morello's first electric guitar. He bought it for US$50 while his mother bought him an amplifier. It has an SG style body and is finished in cherry red. As of 2012, the guitar is still in Morello's possession and he refers to it as "a good, old friend".

Effects and amplifiers
Morello's amplifier and effects setup has remained practically the same throughout his career in Rage Against the Machine, Audioslave, Street Sweeper Social Club and Prophets of Rage.

Current Pedalboard
Although unconfirmed, it is believed that Morello runs all of his pedals through the effects loop on his Marshall.
Boss TU-3 Chromatic Tuner
DigiTech Whammy WH-1
Dunlop Cry Baby Classic GCB-95F
Boss DD-3 Digital Delay (most recently seen with two DD-3s: one for a dedicated long delay setting for solos, and the other to go between a short, "slapback" setting and an eighth note "ping-pong" long setting)
DOD FX40b Equalizer (Set flat across as a clean volume boost for guitar solos)
MXR Phase 90 M-101 (Replaced Morello's Ibanez Flanger around the time Audioslave was formed, now only used for the intro of Killing in the Name)
 Digitech XP-300 "Space Station" (Digitech created this pedal – which imitates a lot of Morello's sounds – after the initial success of Rage Against the Machine. 2019 "Rig Rundown" with Premier Guitar that he only uses a couple of the Space Station's settings)

Past Effects
Dunlop Cry Baby Original GCB-95 (Morello states that his original Cry Baby is an early 80's model. Retired from the stage, but may still be used in the studio)
Boss DD-2 Digital Delay (used in early Rage Against the Machine)
Ibanez DFL Digital Flanger (used in Rage Against the Machine 1991-2000)
Boss TR-2 Tremolo (used in Audioslave 2002–2007, also heard on Guerrilla Radio with Rage Against the Machine)

Amplification
Marshall JCM800 2205 50-watt head (with the Marshall logo blocked out to avoid endorsement proposals)
Peavey VTM 4x12 Cabinet (fitted with four Celestion G12K-85 speakers)
Morello said in his "Rig Rundown" that after his gear was stolen on Valentine's Day years ago, he bought the Marshall head and the Peavey cabinet because he had a session the next weekend and had to "get what [the music store] had." He also removed the Peavey logo from the front of the cabinet because at the time, Hollywood musicians "couldn't be seen with Peavey."

Selected discography

Lock Up
 Something Bitchin' This Way Comes (1989)

Rage Against the Machine
 Rage Against the Machine (1992)
 Evil Empire (1996)
 Live & Rare (1998)
 The Battle of Los Angeles (1999)
 Renegades (2000)
 Live at the Grand Olympic Auditorium (2003)

Audioslave
 Audioslave (2002)
 Out of Exile (2005)
 Revelations (2006)

The Nightwatchman
 One Man Revolution (2007)
 The Fabled City (2008)
 Union Town (2011)
 World Wide Rebel Songs (2011)

Street Sweeper Social Club
 Street Sweeper Social Club (2009)
 The Ghetto Blaster EP (2010)

Bruce Springsteen
 Wrecking Ball (2012)
 High Hopes (2014)

Prophets of Rage
 The Party's Over EP (2016)
 Prophets of Rage (2017)

Solo
 The Atlas Underground (2018)
 Comandante (2020)
 The Atlas Underground Fire (2021)
 The Atlas Underground Flood (2021)

Filmography
 Saturday Night Live (Episode #21.17, 1996) .... Musical Guest (Rage Against the Machine)
 Star Trek: Insurrection (1998) .... Son'a officer (uncredited)
 Star Trek: Voyager (Season 6, Episode 20, 2000, "Good Shepherd") .... Crewman Mitchell
 Made (2001) .... Best Man
 Berkeley (2005) .... Blue
 Metal: A Headbanger's Journey (2005) .... Himself
 Iron Man (2008) .... Insurgent #5
 Chevolution (2008) .... Himself
 Iron Maiden: Flight 666 (2009) .... Himself
 Bruce Springsteen's High Hopes (2014) .... Himself
 High Hopes In South Africa (2014) .... Himself
 Metal Lords (2022) .... Himself

References

External links

Living people
20th-century American guitarists
20th-century American musicians
21st-century American composers
21st-century American guitarists
21st-century American musicians
Activists from New York (state)
Activists from Illinois
African-American Catholics
African-American guitarists
African-American rock musicians
Alternative metal guitarists
American communists
American anti-fascists
Far-left politics in the United States
American anti–Iraq War activists
American democratic socialists
American heavy metal guitarists
American male guitarists
American male singer-songwriters
American people of Irish descent
American people of Italian descent
American people of Kenyan descent
American people of Kikuyu descent
American punk rock guitarists
Audioslave members
Class of '99 members
Grammy Award winners
Guitarists from Illinois
Guitarists from New York City
Harvard University alumni
Industrial Workers of the World members
Kenyatta family
Lead guitarists
Lock Up (American band) members
Members of the Democratic Socialists of America
Midwest hip hop musicians
Singer-songwriters from Illinois
Singers from New York City
People from Harlem
People from Libertyville, Illinois
Prophets of Rage members
Rage Against the Machine members
Rap metal musicians
African-American songwriters
Mom + Pop Music artists
New West Records artists
Singer-songwriters from New York (state)
1964 births
E Street Band members